"The Colonel" is the thirteenth episode and the season finale of the first season of the period drama television series The Americans. It originally aired on FX in the United States on May 1, 2013.

Plot
After being arrested for not paying his child support, Sanford Prince (Tim Hopper) is in FBI custody. Stan Beeman (Noah Emmerich) tells his boss, Agent Frank Gaad (Richard Thomas), that they should leave Sanford locked up until he wants to talk.

Elizabeth (Keri Russell) meets Claudia (Margo Martindale) where she reaffirms her suspicions about the upcoming meeting with an informant, Colonel Lyle Rennhull, especially now that Sanford, who had arranged the connection, has been moved to federal custody. She also tells Claudia about a meeting between Caspar Weinberger and James Baker — information she learned from the bug planted in Weinberger's study (which the FBI are now aware of). Claudia tells her she won't be their handler for very long after Elizabeth and Philip (Matthew Rhys) requested for her to be transferred.

Elizabeth meets Philip at their office, where she continues to question the authenticity of the Colonel. She tells Philip that if the meeting is a set-up, he needs to leave with their children for Canada, knowing that she will be identified by Stan immediately. Philip volunteers to take the mission with the Colonel, but Elizabeth declines and tells him he instead needs to go and collect the tape that recorded Weinberger's meeting with Baker. Meanwhile, Arkady (Lev Gorn) tells Nina (Annet Mahendru) that Moscow has decided to let her live, despite reservations that she can betray the Americans. Gaad tells his men that they will arrest the KGB agent who arrives to collect the Weinberger tape.

Stan tries to reconcile with his wife Sandra (Susan Misner) by offering a vacation to Jamaica, but she hasn't forgiven him for having an affair. Down in the basement, Elizabeth listens to an old tape of her mother speaking fondly about pictures she's seen of her grandchildren Paige (Holly Taylor) and Henry (Keidrich Sellati).

Claudia, posing as a friend of a tenant, knocks on the door of Richard Patterson (Paul Fitzgerald), the CIA official responsible for the killing of General Zhukov. After convincing him to allow her to use his phone, she uses a stun gun to disarm him, injects him with something that paralyzes his entire body, and slowly cuts his jugular vein. She then holds up a picture of General Zhukov, telling the dying Patterson they had been lovers. Paige, awake from a nightmare, catches Elizabeth coming out of their laundry room. Elizabeth claims she was folding clothes, but Paige is suspicious.

Claudia tries to convince Arkady to call off the meeting with the Colonel, telling him that she's responsible for the Jennings' safety. But he declines, saying that it's a risk worth taking. Stan reassures Nina that at the end of the day, her exfiltration will be approved. Elizabeth receives a note from Philip, telling her that he's taking the meeting with the Colonel. Nina tells Arkady that the FBI are planning something and he assumes the meeting with the Colonel is a trap. To alert the agents, Arkady dispatches several cars with an "abort" signal (an oblong lambda) spray-painted on the side.

Philip meets Colonel Rennhull, with Claudia watching. Rennhull provides him with schematics that he says are 50 years away from being possible. Claudia spots a car with the abort signal and interrupts Philip's meeting with Rennhull. When no FBI agents intervene, they realize it's instead Elizabeth's mission that is compromised. Elizabeth makes her way towards the bugged car to collect the tape, but before she can, Philip arrives and collects her. Stan recognizes them as the couple that kidnapped Patterson and agents intervene, shooting at Philip and Elizabeth. Philip reverses the car and loses the FBI in their pursuit, stealing another car. However, Elizabeth has been shot by Stan. Stan returns to Nina, where he tells her that his mission failed and she won't be exfiltrated yet. Later, while Elizabeth is getting surgery for her gunshot wound, Philip asks Stan to take care of the children, using a cover story that Elizabeth has to take care of her sickly great-aunt, and Philip is obliged to go with her.

In a montage played to Peter Gabriel's "Games Without Frontiers", Martha (Alison Wright) happily puts on her wedding ring after coming home from work; Sanford is still in FBI custody, now talking to Gaad about the Colonel; Nina hands Arkady a file on Stan; Paige and Henry are at the Beemans' while their parents are gone.

Elizabeth wakes up, where she tells Philip to "come home" in Russian. Back home, now curious about her mother's behavior, Paige is seen looking around the laundry room (where she sees nothing out of the ordinary) as the episode ends.

Production
The episode was written by Joel Fields and series creator Joe Weisberg and directed by Adam Arkin.

Reception
In its original American broadcast on May 1, 2013, "The Colonel" was watched by 1.74 million viewers, according to Nielsen ratings.

This episode was submitted by Margo Martindale for 2013 Emmy Consideration in the category of Outstanding Guest Actress in a Drama Series.

References

External links
 

The Americans (season 1) episodes
2013 American television episodes